Jean Guinard (18 October 1899 – 23 October 1992) was a French painter. His work was part of the painting event in the art competition at the 1924 Summer Olympics.

References

1899 births
1992 deaths
19th-century French painters
20th-century French painters
20th-century French male artists
French male painters
Olympic competitors in art competitions
People from Paimpol
19th-century French male artists